Les or Leslie Smith may refer to:

Les Smith (footballer, born 1918) (1918–1995), footballer for England, Aston Villa and Brentford
Les Smith (footballer, born 1920) (1920–2001), footballer for Oldham Athletic and Huddersfield Town
Les Smith (footballer, born 1921) (1921–1993), English footballer for Mansfield Town
Les Smith (footballer, born 1927) (1927–2008), footballer for Wolverhampton Wanderers and Aston Villa
Leslie Smith (businessman) (1918–2005), British entrepreneur; co-founder of Lesney Products and the Matchbox cars
Leslie Smith (singer) (born 1949), American singer
Les Smith (born 1967), British keyboard player
Les Smith (Australian footballer) (1900–1975), Australian rules footballer for Geelong
Les Smith (footballer, born 1892) (1892–1968), Australian rules footballer for Melbourne
Les Smith (footballer, born 1934), Australian rules footballer for Collingwood
Leslie Smith (skier) (born 1958), American former alpine skier
Leslie Smith (fighter) (born 1982), American mixed martial arts fighter
Leslie Smith III (born 1985), African American visual artist
Leslie C. Smith, American military officer and Inspector General of the U.S. Army
Leslie M. Smith (born 1961), American mathematician, mechanical engineer, and engineering physicist

See also
Lesley Smith (born 1957), British actress